WQXB is an FM radio station licensed to the city of Grenada, Mississippi. It has a country format known as "B 100".

The station is owned by The Rayanna Corp.

WQXB is a member of The Holmes Football Radio Network.

Ownership history
Effective February 1, 2014, WQXB was transferred from Chatterbox, Inc. to The Rayanna Corp. for no consideration in an intra-family deal.

References

External links
B 100 Facebook

QXB